This is a list of mosques in Argentina. It lists mosques (Arabic: Masjid, Spanish: Mezquita) and Islamic centres in Argentina, South America. It lists some but by no means all of the mosques in Argentina.

There are more than 10 established mosques in Argentina. The number of are increasing with the  growth of Islam in Argentina and increasing number of Muslim tourists visiting the country. However finding a mosque or Muslim prayer facilities outside major cities is difficult.

List of mosques in Argentina

See also
 Islam in Argentina
 Religion in Argentina
 Lists of mosques (worldwide)
 List of mosques in the Americas
 List of mosques in Brazil
 List of mosques in Mexico

References 

 
Argentina